Veli-Jussi Hölsö (27 May 1919 – 20 September 1987) was a Finnish sports shooter. He competed in the 25 m pistol event at the 1952 Summer Olympics.

References

1919 births
1987 deaths
Finnish male sport shooters
Olympic shooters of Finland
Shooters at the 1952 Summer Olympics
Sportspeople from Vaasa